James Alexander Campbell  (1825 – 9 May 1908) was a Scottish businessman and Conservative politician.

Biography
Campbell was born in George Square, Glasgow a son of Sir James Campbell of Stracathro and his wife Janet Bannerman of Manchester. His father established the firm  J & W Campbell, wholesale merchants and was Lord Provost of Glasgow between 1840 and 1843. Campbell was educated at Glasgow High School and Glasgow University and became a partner in the family firm of J & W Campbell. He became a member of Glasgow University Council in 1859, and in 1865 was appointed convener of the committee in charge of raising of funds to build and maintain a new university on Gilmorehill. He held the post until 1894. He was  a J.P. and Deputy Lieutenant for the counties of Lanark and Forfar.

In 1880, Campbell was elected Member of Parliament for  Glasgow and Aberdeen Universities, and held the seat until 1906. As a Conservative he was opposed to the policies of his brother, Henry Campbell-Bannerman, Liberal prime minister from 1905 to 1908. He acted on many Commissions appointed to enquire into Scottish educational endowments and  the constitution of the Scottish Universities.

Campbell married in 1854, Ann Peto, daughter of Sir S. Morton Peto, Bt. a railway contractor, and they had one son and three daughters. He died at Stracathro at the age of 83 after a lingering illness,  a fortnight later than his brother.

References

External links

1825 births
1908 deaths
Scottish Tory MPs (pre-1912)
People educated at the High School of Glasgow
Members of the Parliament of the United Kingdom for Glasgow and Aberdeen Universities
UK MPs 1880–1885
UK MPs 1885–1886
UK MPs 1886–1892
UK MPs 1892–1895
UK MPs 1895–1900
UK MPs 1900–1906
Deputy Lieutenants of Lanarkshire
Deputy Lieutenants of Forfarshire
Members of the Privy Council of the United Kingdom